The 1932 Chicago White Sox season was the White Sox's 32nd season in the major leagues, and their 33rd season overall. They finished with a record of 49–102, good enough for seventh place in the American League, 56.5 games behind the first place New York Yankees. The 1932 season was their worst ever (by winning percentage).

Offseason 
 September 30, 1931: Carey Selph was drafted by the White Sox from the St. Louis Cardinals in the 1931 rule 5 draft.

Regular season

Season standings

Record vs. opponents

Notable transactions 
 April 27, 1932: Bruce Campbell and Bump Hadley were traded by the White Sox to the St. Louis Browns for Red Kress.
 September 9, 1932: Chad Kimsey was purchased by the White Sox from the St. Louis Browns.
 September 11, 1932: The White Sox traded players to be named later to the St. Louis Cardinals for Evar Swanson. The White Sox completed the deal by sending Carey Selph and Jack Rothrock to the Cardinals on November 2.
 September 28, 1932: Al Simmons was purchased by the White Sox from the Philadelphia Athletics.

Roster

Player stats

Batting

Starters by position 
Note: Pos = Position; G = Games played; AB = At bats; H = Hits; Avg. = Batting average; HR = Home runs; RBI = Runs batted in

Other batters 
Note: G = Games played; AB = At bats; H = Hits; Avg. = Batting average; HR = Home runs; RBI = Runs batted in

Pitching

Starting pitchers 
Note: G = Games pitched; IP = Innings pitched; W = Wins; L = Losses; ERA = Earned run average; SO = Strikeouts

Other pitchers 
Note: G = Games pitched; IP = Innings pitched; W = Wins; L = Losses; ERA = Earned run average; SO = Strikeouts

Relief pitchers 
Note: G = Games pitched; W = Wins; L = Losses; SV = Saves; ERA = Earned run average; SO = Strikeouts

Farm system

Notes

References 
1932 Chicago White Sox at Baseball Reference

Chicago White Sox seasons
Chicago White Sox season
Chicago White